Sander is a village in the municipality of Sør-Odal in Innlandet county, Norway. The village has a train station, a kindergarten, an elementary school and a grocery store. The area around the village is dominated by agriculture. The local sports club is Sander IL. 

The Kongsvingerbanen railway line runs through the village. There is a bridge over the river Glomma at Sander, which connects the village to the European route E16 highway that runs along the other side of the river.

References

Sør-Odal
Villages in Innlandet
Populated places on the Glomma River